Longmoor Military Railway number 600 Gordon is a preserved British steam locomotive.  It was built during World War II to the War Department "Austerity" 2-10-0 design, and was the last steam locomotive owned by the British Army. It had the same power output as the Austerity 2-8-0 but a lighter axle load, making it suitable for secondary lines. The middle driving wheels of the class have no flange, to ease turning on tighter tracks.

Service

Gordon was the second of 150 2-10-0 locomotives built for the War Department by the North British Locomotive Co. at its Hyde Park Works in Glasgow. The locomotive entered service in December 1943 as No. 3651, shortly afterward becoming No. 73651 when the instruction was given during 1944 to increase WD numbers by 70,000. Although most of the first batch of 100 saw service overseas, Gordon remained in the UK throughout the War.  

After the War the locomotive was used by the Royal Engineers on the Longmoor Military Railway in Hampshire, UK. It was renumbered 600 in 1952 and given the name Gordon in honour of the Royal Engineers' most famous General, Charles Gordon ("Gordon of Khartoum").

While at the LMR, Gordon was used both on general duties and for instructional use. During the Suez Crisis in 1956 it was reputed to have worked secret nightly trains carrying Government materials between Longmoor and Southampton Docks.

By the 1960s Gordon was the last steam locomotive still in use at the LMR and had become a popular attraction at enthusiasts' specials, including working on BR metals between Woking and Liss on 30 April 1966.

Preservation

When the LMR closed in October 1969,  Gordon was offered a home on the Severn Valley Railway, arriving there in 1972 and operating on and from 29 July of that year. In July 1975 it took part in the Stockton and Darlington 150 celebrations at Shildon, being steamed in the cavalcade. In May 1980 it took part in the Locomotive Parade at Rocket 150, the 150th Anniversary of the opening of the Liverpool and Manchester Railway at Rainhill. Gordon also served as Gordon the Big Engine from Thomas the Tank Engine & Friends as part of SVR's former Day out with Thomas events. 

Gordon was withdrawn from service in 1999 after a boiler tube blew. The engine was deemed not cost effective to repair at that time. After being stored outside for many years, it was given a cosmetic repaint and was one of the first locomotives placed in The Engine House museum adjoining  in March 2008. On 25 July 2008 the locomotive was formally handed-over by the Army to the Severn Valley Railway, who had been looking after it in a caretaker capacity.  it remains on display while awaiting an overhaul.

References

Sources

External links

Severn Valley Railway 'LMR 600 Gordon'

WD Austerity 2-10-0
Preserved steam locomotives of Great Britain
Severn Valley Railway
Standard gauge steam locomotives of Great Britain